Cosmopterix pustulatella is a moth in the family Cosmopterigidae. It is found on Java.

References

Natural History Museum Lepidoptera generic names catalog

pustulatella